Nocera is a dark black Italian grape variety producing deeply colored, high acidity wines. It originates from the north eastern region of Sicily and is now also grown in Calabria. It is an allowed component of five DOC wines (Bivongi, Mamertino di Milazzo, Sicilia, Faro, and S. Anna di Isola Capo Rizzuto) as well as 15 IGT wines. It has good vigor but poor disease resistance.

Synonyms
Barbe du sultan, Carricante nero, Nerelli, Nicera, Nocera de catane, Nocera di catania, Nocera mantonico, Nocera nera di milazzo, Nucera, Nucera niura

See also 
 List of Italian grape varieties

References

Red wine grape varieties